Pawhuska (YTB-822) was a United States Navy  named for Pawhuska, Oklahoma.

Construction
The contract for Pawhuska was awarded 9 August 1971. She was laid down on 9 January 1973 at Marinette, Wisconsin, by Marinette Marine and launched 7 June 1973.

Operational history
Stricken from the Navy List 28 October 2002, Pawhuska was sold by Defense Reutilization and Marketing Service (DRMS)  9 September 2005.  In commercial service as Teclutsa.

References

External links
 

Natick-class large harbor tugs
1973 ships